In telecommunication, a n-entity is an active element in the n-th layer of the Open Systems Interconnection--Reference Model (OSI-RM) that (a) interacts directly with elements, i.e., entities, of the layer immediately above or below the n-th layer, (b) is defined by a unique set of rules, i.e., syntax, and information formats, including data and control formats, and (c) performs a defined set of functions. 

The n refers to any one of the 7 layers of the OSI-RM. 

In an existing layered open system, the n may refer to any given layer in the system. 

Layers are conventionally numbered from the lowest, i.e., the physical layer, to the highest, so that the -th layer is above the n-th layer and the -th layer is below.

References

Network architecture
OSI protocols
Reference models